Wells is an unincorporated community in Pipe Creek Township, Miami County, in the U.S. state of Indiana.

History
Wells was founded by James Oscar Wells, and others.

References

Unincorporated communities in Miami County, Indiana
Unincorporated communities in Indiana